Leviathan is the seventeenth full-length album by Swedish symphonic metal band Therion. It was released on 22 January 2021 by Nuclear Blast Records. It is the first part in the planned Leviathan trilogy, its sequels Leviathan II and Leviathan III are scheduled for 2022 and 2023 respectively.

Two music videos were released for the album: Die Wellen der Zeit and Tuonela; also a lyric video was released for the song Leviathan. A few months after the release of the album, a third music video was made for Eye of Algol.

Vocalist Thomas Vikström confirmed that the band indeed aimed to make a more "normal" album again.

Lyrical themes
As with most Therion albums, all songs are based on various mythology. All lyrics are written by Per Albinsson except "Psalm of Retribution", which was written by Christofer Johnsson.

 The Leaf on the Oak of Far is about Camulus, a Gaelic god of war.
 Tuonela is the underworld of dead in Finnish mythology.
 Leviathan is the enormous sea serpent from the Old Testament.
 Die Wellen der Zeit ("The Waves of Time" in German) is about Nerthus, goddess of peace and prosperity. 
 Aži Dahāka is a monstrous snake-man in Iranian mythology.
 Eye of Algol is about star in Perseus constellation. In Greek mythology it is associated with the head of Medusa the Gorgon.
 Nocturnal Light is about Inanna (known better by some as Ishtar), Sumerian goddess of love, similar to Venus.
 Great Marquis of Hell is about demon Aamon, a Marquis of Hell in Ars Goetia.
 Psalm of Retribution is based on Kaballah and references A'arab Zaraq and Qliphoth.
 El Primer Sol  ("The first Sun" in Spanish) is about creator god Tezcatlipoca, as well as the Five Suns Myth in Aztec mythology.
 Ten Courts of Diyu is about the afterworld judgement in Chinese mythology.

Reception 
Critical reception of Leviathan was mostly positive; many critics compared the album to Therion's albums of 2000s and considered it a band's "return" after two softer and more complex concept albums.

Track listing

Personnel 
 Christofer Johnsson – rhythm guitar, keyboards, programming
 Christian Vidal – lead guitar
 Nalle Påhlsson – bass
 Thomas Vikström – lead and backing vocals
 Lori Lewis – soprano (3, 5, 7, 8 and 9)

Guest vocalists 
 Rosalia Sairem – lead vocals (1, 6 and 10), mezzo-soprano (6)
 Chiara Malvestiti – soprano (3, 5 and 7)
 Taida Nazraić – lead vocals (2, 4 and 11)
 Noa Gruman – lead vocals (11)
 Marko Hietala – lead vocals (2)
 Mats Levén – lead vocals (9)
 Hellscore – choir

Guest instrumentalists 
 Jonas Öijvall – hammond organ (5 and 6)
 Snowy Shaw – drums (4, 5, 7, 10 and 11)
 Björn Höglund – drums (1, 2, 3, 6, 8 and 9)
 Ally Storch – solo violin (2)
 Fabio Amurri – keyboards, programming

Charts

References

2021 albums
Nuclear Blast albums
Therion (band) albums